Change of Heart may refer to:

Film and television 
 Change of Heart, a 1928 French silent film
 Change of Heart, a 1934 film starring Janet Gaynor
 Change of Heart, a 1938 film starring Gloria Stuart
 Hit Parade of 1943, an American musical film also known as Change of Heart
 Change of Heart, a dating television show
 "Change of Heart", a 1998 episode of Star Trek: Deep Space Nine
 "Change of Heart", an episode in season 1 of the American animated television show The Zeta Project
 "Change of Heart", an episode in series 4 of Holby City

Music 
 Change of Heart, a Canadian alternative rock band

Albums 
 Change of Heart, a 1978 album and title song by Eric Carmen
 Change of Heart, a 1984 album and title song by Change
 Change of Heart, a 1988 album and title song by Jon Gibson
 Change of Heart, a 2014 album by Beverley Craven

Songs 
 "Change of Heart", a 1983 song by Tom Petty and the Heartbreakers
 "Change of Heart", a 1984 song by Toto from Isolation
 "Change of Heart", a 1986 song by Cyndi Lauper
 "Change of Heart", a 1988 song by the Judds
 "Change of Heart", a 1989 song by Pat Metheny, Dave Holland and Roy Haynes on Question and Answer
 "Change of Heart", a 1991 song by Diana Ross on The Force Behind the Power
 "Change of Heart", a 1995 song by Jimmy Barnes
 "Change of Heart", a 2009 song by El Perro del Mar's on Love Is Not Pop
 "Change of Heart", a 2014 song by TOPS on Picture You Staring

In print 
 Change of Heart, a 2008 novel by Jodi Picoult
 Change of Heart, a newspaper written and sold by homeless individuals in Lawrence, Kansas
 Peach Girl: Change of Heart, a collection of the final ten books in the Peach Girl manga series

See also 
 A Change of Heart (disambiguation)